Sansiri is one of the largest real estate developers in Thailand.

History 
Sansiri was founded in 1984 as the holding company to manage the assets of the Chutrakul family, before merging with the Lamsam family company in 1994. The company has been listed on the Stock Exchange of Thailand since 1996. In its earlier years, the company concentrated on developing exclusively mid-city condominiums for sale and for rent. In 1998, the company expanded into property management and sales management services through the newly founded subsidiary named Plus Property Company Limited. In 1999, the company underwent a major expansion into development of landed properties with the launch of the first single-detached housing project.

Sansiri has attempted to move upmarket with their Wireless Road project, selling for up to 700,000 THB/Sqm in Bangkok and their luxury Phuket Baan Maikhao beachfront condominium project priced up to over 200,000 THB per sqm.

Recent rapid expansion of the Sansiri portfolio has brought quality challenges, with Baan Maikhao currently undergoing major structural reconstruction work just 3 years after opening. Many units remain unsold despite heavy discounting and promotions.

Due to heavy promotions costs and poor quality delivery of luxury condominium units resulting in heavy rectification costs, Sansiri’s Stock (BKK:SIRI) price hit a 52 week low in November 2018. during 2021, the stock price sank further before recovering somewhat Sansiri heavily relies on foreign purchasers from Hong Kong and China.

For 2019 Sansiri has undertaken an extensive social media campaign highlighting its global ambitions and recognition of its green social responsibilities.  Sansiri invested in "The Standard" hotel group just before the Covid pandemic brought the travel and leisure business to a standstill. 

Sansiri has recently come under public criticism again for its poor quality of construction, while claiming to be the "Number one and most trusted developer”.  Customer complaints are met with lawsuits for defamation under the criminal statutes of Thailand, however, assuring little or no customer
complaints reach the public eye. 

Analysts and Media Reports have recently noted Sansiri’s slide from top to bottom of the 10 ranking property development firms in Thailand.

Milestones

Business groups
Sansiri Group includes Sansiri Public Company Limited and its fifteen subsidiaries. The core businesses of Sansiri Group are summarized as follows:
Property development
Property development for sale includes single-detached houses, pool villas, semi-detached houses, townhouses, and condominiums.
Property development for rent includes office buildings, an apartment, and a leasehold commercial building.
Property services includes the administration of condominiums, single-detached houses, office buildings, apartments, and retails. Also included in property services are sales management and property brokerage services. 
Hospitality business consists of Casa del Mare, a 46-key boutique hotel in Hua Hin and S-Medical spa, an aesthetics, health care and medical spa which is the winner of Medical Spa of the year 2007 by AsiaSpa Magazine.

References

SET50 Index and SET100 Index
Stock Exchange of Thailand

External links
Sansiri corporate website

Thai brands
Real estate companies of Thailand
Companies established in 1984
Companies listed on the Stock Exchange of Thailand
Companies based in Bangkok
1984 establishments in Thailand